This is a list of players who have played or currently playing in the Philippine Basketball Association.

P

Q

R

S

T

More PBA player lists 
A – E  F – J  K – O  P – T  U – Z

References 

 Hardcourt: The Official Philippine Basketball Association Annual

External links 
 
 MYPBA.com
 http://pba-online.net/teams/

P

tl:Talaan ng mga manlalaro ng Philippine Basketball Association